Sanjida Khanam  is a Bangladesh Awami League politician and the incumbent Member of Parliament.

Career
Khanam was elected to Parliament in 2008 from Dhaka-4 as an Awami League candidate. 

Khanam did not contest the election from Dhaka-4 in 2014 after the Awami League decided to support the Jatiya Party candidate Syed Abu Hossain Babla. She was appointed to the 10th parliament from the 24th women's reserved seat.

References

Awami League politicians
Living people
9th Jatiya Sangsad members
10th Jatiya Sangsad members
Women members of the Jatiya Sangsad
Year of birth missing (living people)
21st-century Bangladeshi women politicians